Shahdara Bagh–Chak Amru Branch Line is one of several branch rail lines in Pakistan. It is operated and maintained by Pakistan Railways. The line runs from Shahdara Bagh Junction station to Narowal Junction, extending  to Narowal Junction. It includes 15 stations.

This track is important for the movement of the Army.

Shakargarh station is the biggest station in the Narowal to Chak Amru section. It is the city of 8 lakh peoples and it includes many villages.

Shakargarh is part of Narowal district. Before partition Shakargarh was tehsil of Gurdaspur.

The Shahdrabagh to Narowal track is poorly maintained. Its maximum speed is now 40/50 kph. A previous government spent 359 million rupees on Narowal railway station. Only three trains run on this branch line.

Narowal to Chak Amru section
The line originally ran from Shahdara Bagh Junction station to Chak Amru station, but was later shortened to only reach Narowal. Residents living along the closed section demanded that the section be reopened, including Shakargarh MPA Ghayasuddin.

Railway minister Sheikh Rasheed Ahmed stated that the Kartarpur station would be reconstructed to ease the journey for Sikh pilgrims. In February 2017, the Ministry of Railways began a new study for the reconstruction of the  section.

Stations
The railway stations on this railway line are:
 Shahdara Bagh
 Kot Mul Chand
 Babakwal
 Srirampura
 Kala Khatai
 Shah Sultan Halt
 Narang
 Khundda Ladheke
 Mehta Suja
 Baddomalhi
 Alamgir Town Halt
 Raya Khas
 Daud Halt
 Pejowali
 Kalas Goraya
 Narowal Junction

Closed section
 Jassar Junction
 Darbar Sahib Kartar Pur
 Boston Afghanan
 Nurkot
 Shakargarh
 Mariyal
 Chak Amru

See also
Pakistan Railways

References

Railway stations on Shahdara Bagh–Chak Amru Branch Line
5 ft 6 in gauge railways in Pakistan
Railway lines opened in 1926